Eleanor Dickey Ragsdale (February 23, 1926 – May 5, 1998) was an American educator, entrepreneur, and activist in the Civil Rights Movement in the Phoenix area.

Personal life
Ragsdale graduated from Cheyney University of Pennsylvania in 1947 with a bachelor's degree in education. Shortly after graduating, she relocated to Phoenix, Arizona to accept a position as a kindergarten teacher at Dunbar Elementary School.  In 1949 she married Lincoln Ragsdale, her partner in entrepreneurship and activism in Phoenix's segregated communities.

Civil Rights era activism

Organizations
Ragsdale was an active member of community organizations and became a charter member of the local National Association for the Advancement of Colored People (NAACP), Phoenix Urban League, and Greater Phoenix Council for Civic Unity.  She also served as a member of The Links, Incorporated and clubs and associations advocating women's rights.

Collaboration with the Mexican American community
In the 1960s Ragsdale collaborated with Grace Gill-Olivarez to desegregate schools and to promote better educational opportunities for Mexican American, African American, and other minority students. "Eleanor Ragsdale helped Gill-Olivarez solicit funds to defray the costs for a number of Mexican American high school students to attend evening job-training workshops, and she also worked with administrators at ASU to establish financial aid programs for both incoming African American and Mexican American students". Yet, even as Ragsdale and her colleagues won a victory in desegregating Phoenix schools in 1953, enrollment of white students in these schools dropped, leaving minority students in underfunded, poorly administered schools which created new racial tensions between the African American and Mexican American communities.  Despite Ragsdale's efforts, no unified coalition was able to form.

References

External links

Eleanor Ragsdale at the Arizona Women's Heritage Trail

1926 births
1998 deaths
African-American activists
Schoolteachers from Arizona
20th-century American women educators
Cheyney University of Pennsylvania alumni
People from Phoenix, Arizona
Activists from Philadelphia
20th-century American educators
20th-century African-American women
20th-century African-American educators